The 1964 South Vietnamese coup may refer to:

 January 1964 South Vietnamese coup
 September 1964 South Vietnamese coup attempt
 December 1964 South Vietnamese coup